Nemtsevo is a rural locality (a selo) in Novooskolsky District, Belgorod Oblast, Russia. The population was 240 as of 2010. There are 6 streets.

Geography 
Nemtsevo is located 34 km southwest of Novy Oskol (the district's administrative centre) by road. Shevtsov is the nearest rural locality.

References 

Rural localities in Novooskolsky District